Kuroshio refers to the Kuroshio Current, an oceanic current. 

It may also refer to:

 Kuroshio, Kōchi, a small town in Kōchi Prefecture, Japan
 , a Kagerō-class destroyer of the Imperial Japanese Navy during World War II
 JDS Kuroshio (SS-501), a submarine of the Japanese Maritime Self-Defense Force in 1955
 , an Uzushio-class submarine of the Japanese Maritime Self-Defense Force in 1974
 , an Oyashio-class submarine of the Japanese Maritime Self-Defense Force in 2002
 Kuroshio (train), a Japanese train service
 Kuroshio Sea, a tank in the Okinawa Churaumi Aquarium